Olfen Independent School District is a public school district based in Rowena, Texas (USA).

Located in south central Runnels County, the district has one school that serves students from pre-kindergarten (pre-K) to eighth grade.

In 2009, the school district was rated "academically acceptable" by the Texas Education Agency.

In 2016 the district began making Fridays optional days.

References

External links
Olfen ISD

School districts in Runnels County, Texas